The 2012–13 season of the Israeli Futsal League was the 7th season of top-tier futsal under the Israel Football Association and 13th overall. The regular season started on 25 December 2012 and was concluded on 30 April 2013. The championship playoffs began on 6 May 2013 with semi-finals series and concluded with the championship final series, played on 13 and 19 May.

Maccabi Nahlat Itzhak Tel Aviv were the defending champions, but lost the title by losing to Rishon LeZion Futsal Club in the playoff semi-final. ASA Ben-Gurion University won the title by defeating Rishon LeZion in the play-off final.

Format changes
With 6 clubs registered to play in the league, the clubs played each other in a triple round-robin tournament. At the end of the regular season, the top four teams qualified to the playoffs, while the two bottom teams competed for 5th place.

Regular season table

Playoffs

Championship bracket

5th place

References

External links
Israeli Futsal League 2012-2013 IFA 

Israeli Futsal League
Futsal
Israel